Seck is a surname found both in German and Senegalese populations. Notable people with the surname include:

Performers
 Cheick Tidiane Seck, Malian musician
 Djeneba Seck, Malian singer
 Mansour Seck, Senegalese musician
 Thione Seck, Senegalese musician

Politicians
 Assane Seck, Senegalese politician
 Awa Marie Coll-Seck, Senegalese politician
 Idrissa Seck, Prime Minister of Senegal, 2002-2004
 Mamadou Seck (politician)
 Ousmane Seck, Senegalese politician
 Ramatoulaye Seck, Senegalese politician

Sportspeople
 Abdoul Karim Seck, Senegalese judoka
 Abdoulaye Seck (footballer, born 1988)
 Abdoulaye Seck (footballer, born 1992)
 Anke von Seck, German canoe racer
 Baba Ndaw Seck, Senegalese footballer
 Babacar Seck, Senegalese basketball player
 Charles-Louis Seck, Senegalese sprinter
 Cheikh Seck, Senegalese footballer
 Demba Seck, Senegalese footballer
 Ibrahima Seck, Senegalese footballer
 Leyti Seck Austrian-Senegalese skier 
 Malick Seck, Senegalese judoka
 Mamadou Seck (footballer)
 Mbaye Seck, Senegalese footballer
 Moustapha Seck, Senegalese footballer
 Saliou Seck, Senegalese sprinter
 Seydou Bocar Seck, Senegalese footballer
 Steve Seck, American judoka

Others
 Fodé Seck, Senegalese diplomat
 Mame Seck Mbacké, Senegalese writer
 Rudolf Joachim Seck, Nazi war criminal

See also 
 Seeck
 Secker

German-language surnames
Senegalese surnames